The 1984 Western Kentucky Hilltoppers football team represented Western Kentucky University as an independent during the 1984 NCAA Division I-AA football season. Led by first-year head coach Dave Roberts, the Hilltoppers compiled a record of 2–9.

Schedule

References

Western Kentucky Hilltoppers football seasons
{Western Kentucky Hilltoppers football